The Aich  is a river in Baden-Württemberg, Germany. It is a left tributary of the Neckar in Nürtingen.

Geography

The Aich's origin is in Holzgerlingen. It flows to the north through Neuweiler and then south past Schönaich and Waldenbuch. It then flows through the Schönbuch nature park before passing through Betzenberg. After that, it flows through Aichtal before finally passing through Oberensingen and into the Neckar. The river is home to some species of white fish.

Tributaries 
 Eschelbach (right), 2,2 km, 1,8 km²
 Aischbach (right), 3,1 km, 2,8 km²
 Keckbach (right), 1,6 km, 1,9 km²
 Krähenbach (left), 4,8 km, 8,1 km²
 Kohlklingenbach (right), 0,4 km
 Seebach (left), 2,1 km, 1,9 km²
 Losklinge (left), 1,6 km
 Seebach (left), 6,9 km, 14,8 km²
 Laubbach (right), 1,6 km
 Faulbach (right), 3,0 km
 Erbeerbühl(bach) (left), 1,4 km
 Groppbach (left), 1,7 km
 Seitenbach (right), 9,4 km
 Immenbach (right), 2,97 km
 Brunnenbach (right), 1,7 km
 Diebsklinge (right), 1,6 km
 Stellenbrunnen (right), 0,95 km
 Reichenbach (left), 13,3 km
 Schaich (right), 23,6 km
 Baumbach (left), 7,5 km
 Baiersbach (right), 2,07 km
 Finsterbach (left), 2,3 km
 Weiherbach (left), 4,4 km
 Follbach (left'''), 3,5 km
 Teufelsklinge (left''), 0,7 km

See also
List of rivers of Baden-Württemberg

References

Rivers of Baden-Württemberg
Rivers of Germany